Haidar Nateq Jasim Al Zamili (born in Baghdad, 1975) is an Iraqi politician and Iraqi Minister of Justice. He is a candidate for the Islamic Virtue Party. He holds a PhD in Computer Science from the University of Petra in Malaysia in 2011. He participated in the formation of the Islamic Virtue Party in Wasit., And included in the political work and assigned several tasks, including the head of the Office of "Essaouira", and became an assistant to the Secretary-General for the affairs of central provinces, and is now a member of the Political Bureau of the party.

References

External links
Official website

Islamic Virtue Party politicians
People from Wasit Governorate
Iraqi Muslims
Government ministers of Iraq
Living people
Justice ministers
1975 births